Jessica Campbell (October 30, 1982 – December 29, 2020) was an American actress and a naturopathic physician.

Her appearances included the roles of Tammy Metzler in the 1999 film Election, for which she was nominated for an Independent Spirit Award for Best Debut Performance, Julie Gold in the 2001 film The Safety of Objects and the two-episode guest role of Amy Andrews in the TV series Freaks and Geeks. 

After retiring from acting in 2002, Campbell later began training to become a naturopathic practitioner. In January 2021, Campbell's family announced that she had died suddenly at home on December 29. The cause of death is currently unknown, but Campbell had reportedly experienced flu-like symptoms on the morning of her death.

Filmography

Film

Television

References

External links

1982 births
2020 deaths
American film actresses
American television actresses
20th-century American actresses
21st-century American actresses
American child actresses
Naturopaths